Rogojevac is a Serbian toponym that may refer to:

Rogojevac (Prijepolje), a village in the municipality of Prijepolje, Serbia
Rogojevac, Kragujevac, a village in the municipality of Kragujevac, Serbia